Blast Off! was the second American release (the first being the self-titled 6-song EP) by the Japanese punk rock band The Blue Hearts. It was released in 1991 and only in America. Though each of the songs was recorded with the original Japanese lyrics, the CD jacket included English translations of each of the songs.

Tracks
The Blue Hearts' previous American release, the self-titled CD/12" vinyl EP, was a 6-song compilation with selections from their self-titled first album, The Blue Hearts, and their second album, Young and Pretty. As with their first American release, this album was also a compilation of songs: this time from their first album and their third, Train-Train. The first four songs were from The Blue Hearts and the rest were from Train-Train, except for "Chernobyl" and "The Blue Hearts Theme", which had only been released as singles in Japan. The original Japanese title of the songs is in parentheses.

References

The Blue Hearts albums
1991 compilation albums